The post of Surveyor General of the Land Revenues of the Crown was an office under the English (later the United Kingdom) Crown, charged with the management of Crown lands. In 1810, by the Act 50 Geo III Cap 65, later amended by the Act 10 Geo IV Cap 50, the functions of the post were merged with those of the Surveyor General of Woods, Forests, Parks, and Chases  and became the responsibility of a new body, the Commissioners of Woods, Forests and Land Revenues.

Surveyors General of the Land Revenues of the Crown
1666 Sir Charles Harbord 
1679 William Harbord
1692 William Tailer 
1693 Samuel Travers
1710 John Manley
1714 Alexander Pendarves
1715 Hugh Cholmeley
1722 John Pulteney
1726 Phillips Gybbon
1730 Exton Sayer
1732 Thomas Walker
1750 John Monckton, 1st Viscount Galway
1751 Hon. Robert Sawyer Herbert
1769 Peter Burrell
1775 Hon. John St John
1784 George Augustus Selwyn
1794 John Fordyce 
1809 James Pillar (acting)

References
R.B. Pugh:  The Crown Estate – an Historical Essay, London, The Crown Estate, 1960
Annual Report of Commissioners of Woods & Forests 1811
The Crown Estate publication scheme: website consulted January 2007

Lists of British people
Land management in the United Kingdom
Defunct ministerial offices in the United Kingdom
Defunct forestry agencies